Homemade Biscuits is the debut studio album by Australian singer Dan Sultan, released in March 2006. The album was produced with the help of funding from the John Butler's Seed program.

Reception
WaterFront Records said "Dan Sultan has emerged as one of this country's great male vocalists with multi instrumental skills and great songwriting. Scott Wilson is one of the great guitar players and an equally great songwriter, producer and session muso. Dan and Scott worked together in 2005 to produce an amazing album under Dan's name called Homemade Biscuits - an absolute treat with a cool style of country soul edged songs with strong vocal harmonies and great playing."

Track listing

Release history

References

2006 debut albums
Self-released albums
Dan Sultan albums